

See also 
 United States House of Representatives elections, 1804 and 1805
 List of United States representatives from New Hampshire

1804
New Hampshire
United States House of Representatives